Lowesdale is a town community in Australia in the central south part of the Riverina and situated about 2 kilometres north of Buraja and 92 kilometres east of Berrigan on the Riverina Highway. At the 2021 census, Lowesdale had a population of 100.

Lowesdale Post Office opened on 1 August 1876 and closed in 1994.

Sport and recreation
In 1915, the small community of Lowesdale entered two football teams in the Coreen & District Football Association, Lowesdale FC and the Lowesdale Military FC who went onto win the 1915 premiership. Both teams went into recess in 1916 due to WW1 and neither team was ever re-established.

Notes and references

Towns in the Riverina
Towns in New South Wales
Federation Council, New South Wales